Dick Turpin is a 1974 Spanish historical adventure film directed by Fernando Merino and starring Cihangir Ghaffari, Inés Morales and Sancho Gracia. It is based on the life of the legendary English highwayman Dick Turpin.

The film's sets were designed by the art director Adolfo Cofiño.

Plot

Cast
 Cihangir Ghaffari as Dick Turpin 
 Inés Morales as Isabel 
 Sancho Gracia as Richard 
 Manuel Zarzo as Brassier 
 Rafael Hernández as Peter 
 Cris Huerta as Conde de Belfort 
 Helga Liné as Anna 
 Antonio Mayans as Sean McGregor 
 Paloma Cela as María 
 Luis Gaspar as Thomas 
 Ramón Lillo as Dan 
 André Konan as Bud 
 Ricardo Palacios as Moscarda 
 Isabel Luque as Dama asaltada 
 Tito García as Mesonero 
 Juan Antonio Soler as Conde de Durham 
 Javier de Rivera as Fray Benito 
 Cristino Almodóvar as Oficial 1 
 Román Ariznavarreta as Oficial 2

References

Bibliography 
 Pascual Cebollada & Luis Rubio Gil. Enciclopedia del cine español: cronología. Ediciones del Serbal, 1996.

External links 
 

1974 films
Spanish historical adventure films
1970s historical adventure films
1970s Spanish films 
1970s Spanish-language films
1970s historical action films
Films directed by Fernando Merino
Films set in England
Films set in the 18th century
Cultural depictions of Dick Turpin
Spanish swashbuckler films
Films shot in Asturias
Films shot in Madrid